Johan Albrigt Rivertz (14 August 1874 – 14 January 1942) was a county governor of Finnmark county and later a judge on the Supreme Court of Norway.

Personal life
Johan Albrigt Rivertz was born in Korgen in Nordland county, Norway. He was born to the teacher and farmer Ivar Rivertz and his wife Jonella Pernille Jakobsen.  Rivertz married Maria Midelfart in 1899. 

Rivertz died on 14 January 1942 in Oslo.

Education and career
Rivertz graduated with a cand.jur. degree in 1896, and was appointed to a post at the Norwegian Ministry of Justice in 1899. He later served as County Governor of Finnmark from 1912 to 1921. He was named as a Supreme Court Justice in 1922.

References

1874 births
1942 deaths
People from Hemnes
County governors of Norway
Supreme Court of Norway justices